The 2022–23 season is the eighth season of competitive association football and the seventh season in the Liga 1 played by Bali United Football Club, a professional football club based in Gianyar, Bali, Indonesia. Their 1st-place finish in 2021–22, mean it is their seventh successive season in Liga 1.

Coming into the season, Bali United are the two-time reigning Liga 1 champions. They also qualified for the AFC Cup group stage. This season is Bali United's fourth with head coach Stefano Cugurra.

Pre-season and friendlies

Friendlies

Indonesia President's Cup

Match results

Liga 1

AFC Cup

Piala Indonesia

Player details

Appearances and goals 

|-
! colspan="12"| Players transferred out during the season

 No. in bracket is the player's number in AFC Competitions.

Disciplinary record 

|-
! colspan="16"| Players transferred out during the season

Transfers

Transfers in

Transfers out

References 

Bali United F.C. seasons
Bali United